The 4L80-E (and similar 4L85-E) is a series of automatic transmissions from General Motors. Designed for longitudinal engine configurations, the series included 4 forward gears. It was the 4-speed electronically commanded evolution of the 3-speed Turbo-Hydramatic 400, first produced in October 1963.  4L80-Es were optioned only in Chevrolet/GMC pickups, vans, and commercial vehicles, and the Hummer H1. It was also adopted by Rolls-Royce in 1991 and modified after extensive testing, and used initially in the Bentley Continental R, and subsequently other Rolls-Royce and Bentley vehicles. The 4L80 and 4L85 were built at Willow Run Transmission in Ypsilanti, Michigan.

Gear ratios

4L80-E

The 4L80-E (RPO MT1) is rated to handle engines with up to 440 ft·lbf (597 N·m) of torque. The 4L80-E is rated to a maximum GVWR of 18,000 lb, depending on the axle and vehicle.

The 4L80-E uses two shift solenoids, initially called Shift Solenoid A and Shift Solenoid B; they were later changed to comply with OBD-II regulations to 1-2 shift solenoid and 2-3 shift solenoid. By activating and deactivating the solenoids in a predetermined pattern by the PCM, four distinct gear ratios can be achieved. The shift solenoid pattern, also sometimes referred to as solenoid firing order, is as follows:

Shift solenoid pattern

No power results in 2nd gear as "limp home mode."

Applications
 1991–2013 Chevrolet C/K/Chevrolet Silverado/GMC Sierra 2500 and 3500
 1991–2013 Chevrolet/GMC Suburban/GMC Yukon 1500 and 2500
 1991–2009 Chevrolet Van/Chevrolet Express/GMC Savana 2500 and 3500
 2002–2006 Chevrolet Avalanche 2500
 1992–2006 Hummer H1
 1992–1998 Rolls-Royce Silver Spirit/Spur II, III, IV
 1991–1992 Bentley Eight
 1991–1997 Bentley Turbo R
 1991–2002 Bentley Continental R/S/T
 1999–2006 Bentley Arnage Red Label / Bentley Arnage R/RL/T
 1993–1996 Jaguar XJS
 1994–1997 Jaguar XJR
 1993–1997 Jaguar XJ12 / Daimler Double Six
 1996–1999 Aston Martin DB7
 2001–2006 Chevrolet HD trucks

4L85-E
The 4L85-E (RPO MN8) is rated to handle vehicles  with up to 690  ft·lbf (935 N·m) of torque. The 4L85E is rated to handle vehicles with a GVWR of up to 18,000 lbs (dependent on axle ratio and vehicle)

Applications:
 2002–2006 Chevrolet Avalanche 2500
 2001–2006 Chevrolet Suburban / GMC Yukon XL (8.1L Vortec only)
 Chevrolet Express / GMC Savana with Duramax Diesel or 8.1L Vortec
 Rally Fighter

See also
 List of GM transmissions

References

4L80-E